Wheelchair rugby at the 2016 Summer Paralympics was held in the Carioca Arena 1, also known as the Arena Carioca, from 14 September to 18 September 2016. There was a single event, for which both genders are eligible, where 8 teams compete.

Qualification

Teams receive an allocation in the following order, and under the following processes:

 A National Paralympic Committee (NPC) may enter one team. The host country directly qualifies, as long as it has a rank on the IWRF Wheelchair Rugby World Ranking List,  closing 1 May 2016.
 The top ranked NPC (not otherwise qualified) at the 2014 World Championships directly qualifies, subject to the eligibility requirement.
The highest ranked NPC (not otherwise qualified) from the Wheelchair Rugby competition at the 2015 Parapan American Games directly qualifies.
 The two (2) highest ranked NPCs (not otherwise qualified) from the 2015 IWRF European Division A Championship directly qualify.
 The highest ranked NPC (not otherwise qualified) from the 2015 IWRF Asia-Oceania Championship directly qualifies.

If any of the Zonal Championships are not held, then the next highest ranked NPC from that Zone (not otherwise qualified) on the IWRF Wheelchair Rugby World Ranking List closing 1 May 2016 qualifies

 The two (2) highest ranked NPCs from the designated IWRF Paralympic Qualification Tournament qualify. If the Qualification Tournament is not held then the two (2) highest ranked NPCs (not otherwise qualified) on the IWRF Wheelchair Rugby World Ranking List closing 1 May 2016 qualify. In the event, the competition was held, with France and United States qualifying.

Tournament

Group A

Group B

Knockout stage

Classification round

Seventh-place match

Fifth-place match

Medal round

Semifinals

Bronze-medal match

Gold-medal match

References

External links
 International Wheelchair Rugby Federation (IWRF)

 
2016
2016 Summer Paralympics events
2016 in wheelchair rugby
International rugby union competitions hosted by Brazil